The Tonnidae are a family of medium-sized to very large sea snails, known as the tun shells. These are marine gastropod molluscs in the clade Littorinimorpha. The name tun refers to the snails' shell shape, which resembles wine casks known as "tuns". While thin, the shells are also strong and lack opercula. They are found in all tropical seas, where they inhabit sandy areas. During the day, they bury themselves in the substrate, emerging at night to feed on echinoderms (especially sea cucumbers), crustaceans, and bivalves. Some larger species also capture fish, using their expandable probosces to swallow them whole. Females lay rows of eggs that become free-swimming larvae for several months before settling to the bottom.

Taxonomy 
In 2005, these subfamilies were recognized in the taxonomy of Bouchet & Rocroi:
Cassinae Latreille, 1825
Oocorythinae P. Fischer, 1885
Phaliinae Beu, 1981
Tonninae Suter, 1913

Bouchet & Rocroi (2005) listed Cassidae as a synonym of Tonnidae Suter, 1913 (1825), following Riedel (1995) in this. However, later Beu (2008: 272) separated the two families. This is in agreement with the action of Thiele (1925) who placed Tonnidae and Cassidae under "Tonnacea", therefore acting as first reviser under ICZN article 24. In this respect, the World Register of Marine Species follows the opinion of Beu.

Genera
Genera and species within the family Tonnidae include:

The subfamily Cassinae has been raised to the rank of family Cassidae

 Eudolium Dall, 1889
 Malea Vallenciennes, 1832
 Tonna Brunnich, 1771
Genera brought into synonymy 
 Cadium Link, 1807 : synonym of Tonna Brunnich, 1771
 Cadus Röding, 1798  : synonym of Tonna Brunnich, 1771
 Cassidaria Link, 1807  : synonym of Eudolium Dall, 1889
 Doliopsis di Monterosato, 1872 (non Vogt, 1852; non Conrad, 1865)  : synonym of Eudolium Dall, 1889
 Foratidolium Rovereto, 1899: synonym of Tonna Brünnich, 1771
 Macgillivrayia Forbes, 1852 : synonym of Tonna Brünnich, 1771
 Dolium Lamarck, 1801: synonym of Tonna Brunnich, 1771
 Parvitonna Iredale, 1931: synonym of Tonna Brunnich, 1771
 Perdix Montfort, 1810: synonym of Tonna Brunnich, 1771
 Quimalea Iredale, 1929: synonym of Malea Valenciennes, 1832

Further reading
 Vaught, K.C. (1989). A classification of the living Mollusca. American Malacologists: Melbourne, FL (USA). . XII, 195 pp.

References

External links 

 Checklist of Mollusca
 Paleodb